This is a list of defunct airlines of Denmark including the Faroe Islands and Greenland.

See also

 List of airlines of Denmark
 List of airports in Denmark

References

Denmark
Airlines
Airlines, defunct